The Get Schooled Foundation (also Get Schooled or getschooled.com) is a US national non-profit organization helping young people in high school, college, alternative pathways and early career jobs.

School Attendance
Get Schooled is one of the few national education organizations focusing on school attendance as a driver of student success.  In May 2012, it released a study on the scope and consequence of chronic absenteeism in partnership with Johns Hopkins University.  The report found only a handful of states measure and report on chronic absenteeism, which the report defines as missing at least 10 percent of school days in a given year, or about 18 days. It estimates that 10 to 15 percent of students nationwide are chronically absent and that adds up to 5 million to 7.5 million students who miss enough school to be at severe risk of dropping out or failing to graduate from high school.

The data problem is structural and runs from the school to the state to the federal level. At the school level, chronic absenteeism is largely masked by daily attendance rates. A school can report a 90 percent average daily attendance rate and have 40 percent of students chronically  absent, because on different days different students make up the 90 percent. Schools know that students are missing but don’t look at the data by student to show individual absenteeism rates.

Key findings include: 
 Students who are chronically absent in one year will likely be so in subsequent years and may miss more than half a year of school over four or five years.
 Urban schools often have chronic absentee rates as high as one third of students, while poor rural areas are in the 25 percent range.
 While the problem affects youth of all backgrounds, children in poverty are more likely to be chronically absent. In Maryland, chronic absentee rates for poor students were more than 30 percent, compared to less than 12 percent for students from more affluent families.
 Chronically absent students tended to be concentrated in a relatively small number of schools. In Florida, 52 percent of chronically absent students were in just 15 percent of schools.
 In some school districts, kindergarten absenteeism rates are nearly as high as those in high school.

The magnitude of the problem is likely understated as Balfanz and his researchers could find chronic absenteeism reported for only six states: Georgia, Florida, Maryland, Nebraska, Oregon and Rhode Island. Several states, including California and New York, do not even collect the individual data needed to calculate chronic absenteeism.

The impact of these missed days is dramatic – students are less likely to score well on achievement tests and less likely to graduate. Students who miss 10 percent of school days on average score in the 30th percentile on standardized reading and math tests, compared to those with zero absences, scoring in the 50th percentile.

Looking at data from multiple states and school districts, the researchers found that consistently high chronic absenteeism was the strongest predictor of dropping out of high school, stronger even than course failures, suspension or test scores. Data from Georgia showed a very strong relationship between attendance in grades 8-10 and graduation. There was as much as a 50 percentage-point difference in graduation rates for students who missed five or fewer days compared to those who missed 15 or more days.

These findings have been extrapolated into a user-friendly attendance calculator that allows users to see a personalized view of the impact of missed days on the likelihood of graduating and on math and reading achievement tests.

Programs
Get Schooled has several programs it uses to support high school students.

Digital Platform:  Get Schooled is basically a one-stop shop for high school students who need college and financial aid info.  As you consume content on the site about calculating your GPA, making it through high school or applying to college, you earn points. You can cash those points in at the Get Schooled reward store stocked with items for school and life.

College Text Hotline gives personalized help on how to apply for and pay for college including things like the FAFSA, scholarship, loans and general college guidance

Snapchat College Tours give students a student led tour of college campuses from around the country including HBCU's, ivy league colleges as well as larger and smaller public colleges and universities.

Get Schooled badges expose students to targeted content that prepares them for college.  In 2016, Get Schooled announced a set of badges branded "Khaled Keys" inspired by their partnership with DJ Khaled.

Get Schooled also offers scholarships and grants to schools and students throughout the school year.  The Taco Bell Foundation for Teens has been a major funder of these grants.

References

Education in New York City